Amata parish is an administrative unit of Cēsis Municipality in the Vidzeme region of Latvia. Amata village is located in neighboring Drabeši Parish.

Towns, villages and settlements of Amata parish 
 Aparnieki
 Ģikši
 Rencēni
 Spāre
 Velmeri
 Zāģeri

Parishes of Latvia
Cēsis Municipality
Vidzeme